Martin Wiegele (born 11 July 1978) is an Austrian professional golfer.

Wiegele was born in Graz. He turned professional in 2003 when he joined the second tier Challenge Tour. He enjoyed some success during his first season finishing fourth on the end of season rankings to graduate to the top level European Tour for 2004. He almost won his first European Tour event he ever played, losing a playoff against Marcus Fraser in the 2003 BMW Russian Open. He could not keep his European Tour card and had to go back to the Challenge Tour. He struggled for form during the next few seasons due to massive swing changes, before picking up his first big victory at the 2007 Lexus Open. He went on to be medalist at the European Tour Qualifying School at the end of the season to regain his place at the top level.

Having finished 142nd on the Order of Merit in 2008, Wiegele returned to the Challenge Tour in 2009. He picked up his second tournament victory on the Challenge Tour in 2010 at the Kärnten Golf Open, before winning his first European Tour title at the  Saint-Omer Open two weeks later which gave him a one-year exemption on the main tour. He gained his Tour card for the 2012 season by finishing 83rd in the 2011 Race to Dubai, a season in which he finished tied for third in the Barclays Scottish Open.

He missed most of the 2012 season through a hip injury and poor form since has kept him outside the world top-thousand most of the time from 2013 to early 2017. In June 2017 he was a surprise winner of the KPMG Trophy, his best performance since 2011.

Amateur wins
1997 Austrian Amateur Closed Championship
2000 Austrian Amateur Closed Championship
2001 Austrian Amateur Closed Championship
2002 Slovak Amateur Open Championships, Austrian Amateur Closed Championship

Professional wins (5)

European Tour wins (1)

1Dual-ranking event with the Challenge Tour

European Tour playoff record (0–1)

Challenge Tour wins (4)

1Dual-ranking event with the European Tour

Challenge Tour playoff record (1–1)

Alps Tour wins (1)

Results in major championships

CUT = missed the half-way cut
"T" = tied

Team appearances
Amateur
European Boys' Team Championship (representing Austria): 1995, 1996
European Amateur Team Championship (representing Austria): 1997, 1999, 2001
European Youths' Team Championship (representing Austria): 1998
Eisenhower Trophy (representing Austria): 2000, 2002
Bonallack Trophy (representing Europe): 2002
St Andrews Trophy (representing the Continent of Europe): 2002

Professional
World Cup (representing Austria): 2004, 2016
Ponte Veccio Challenge: 2011

See also
2007 European Tour Qualifying School graduates
List of golfers with most Challenge Tour wins

References

External links

Austrian male golfers
European Tour golfers
Sportspeople from Graz
1978 births
Living people